Cherry Ripe is a brand of chocolate bar manufactured by Cadbury Australia. Introduced by the Australian confectioner MacRobertson's in 1924, it is now one of Australia's oldest chocolate bars and is one of the top chocolate bar brands sold in the country. It consists of cherries and coconut coated with dark chocolate.

History 
After Cadbury acquired Australian confectioner MacRobertson's in 1967 it continued to manufacture Cherry Ripe, along with Freddo, Old Gold and Snack.
Cherry Ripe wrappers continued to display the former company's distinctive logo until 2002.

See also
 List of cherry dishes
 List of confectionery brands

References

External links 
 Cadbury Australia - Cherry Ripe
 Candyblog's Cherry Ripe review

Chocolate bars
Cadbury brands
Australian confectionery
Mondelez International brands
Cherry dishes
Products introduced in 1924